Ettelā'āt-e Bānuvān or Banovan was one of the early women's magazines published in Tehran. The magazine was established by Ettelaat Publishing Group in 1957. The first issue of the magazine which was published on a weekly basis appeared in April 1957.

Ettelā'āt-e Bānuvān covered news on celebrities, the royal family, health, beauty, and other topics related to women. The first chief editor of Ettelā'āt-e Bānuvān and one of its founders was Iraj Mosta'an, who was succeeded by Pari Abasalti  in 1968.

The magazine was closed in 1979, but was reopened in 1981. Ettelā'āt-e Bānuvān continued until 1980, and relaunched the following year under the title Rah-e Zaynab, and the editorship of Zahra Rahnavard.

See also
List of women's magazines

References

1957 establishments in Iran
Defunct magazines published in Iran
Magazines established in 1957
Magazines with year of disestablishment missing
Magazines published in Tehran
Persian-language magazines
Weekly magazines published in Iran
Women's magazines published in Iran